Mikołaj Bojańczyk (born 1977) is a Polish theoretical computer scientist and logician known for settling open problems on tree walking automata jointly with Thomas Colcombet, and for contributions to logic in automata theory. He is a professor at Warsaw University.

Biography
Bojańczyk earned his doctorate from Warsaw University in 2004. In 2004–2005 he spent a year at Paris Diderot University. He got his habilitation from Warsaw University in 2008 and has been a full professor there since 2014. Bojańczyk became the first recipient of the Presburger Award in 2010.

References

External links
 
 
 
 
 
 

Polish computer scientists
Academic staff of the University of Warsaw
University of Warsaw alumni
1977 births
Living people